Nicholas Dominick Ryan (born 14 July 1946) is an Irish music producer, recording engineer, and manager. He is best known as the longtime business and recording partner for the singer, songwriter and musician Enya alongside his wife, poet and lyricist Roma Ryan. Born and raised in Dublin, Ryan gained initial recognition in the 1970s and 1980s for his work with several artists including Gary Moore, Planxty, Christy Moore and Clannad.

Early life 
Nicholas Dominick Ryan was born in 1946 in Dublin, Ireland. As a youngster, he won a song contest with a rendition of "In the Mood" by Glenn Miller for which the prize was to meet the Beatles, one of his favourite bands. However, Ryan could not claim the prize as he could not afford the fare to England to see them.

After finishing school, Ryan worked as a teacher at St. Mary's School for Deaf Girls in Dublin, where he experimented with sound engineering to create a way for the deaf children to "hear" music. He designed a speaker system based on the lower end of a pipe organ that allowed for considerable bass to travel across a spring floor in the school's dance room and in their chests, so they can detect the rhythm. "It was an upright speaker consisting of a 14in square box, about six feet tall, and about six inches from the floor – with a 12in speaker facing upwards, and a three inch port below that. And it worked very well. ... The floor shook – and the kids danced away, as they were entitled to."

Career 
In the 1970s and 1980s, Ryan gained recognition for his involvement with several artists including Gary Moore, Planxty, and Christy Moore.

Ryan was introduced to the family Celtic band Clannad by their manager Fachtna O'Kelly. In 1975, he became the sound engineer for the family band Clannad and from 1976, their new manager along with his wife Roma Ryan after O'Kelly left to manage The Boomtown Rats. In 1980, Ryan persuaded Enya, the younger sister of siblings Máire, Pól and Ciarán Brennan, to join the band with them and twin uncles, Noel and Pádraig Duggan. During her two-year stint in the group, Ryan and Enya often discussed his idea of recording many vocal tracks and layering them to create a sound effect inspired by the wall of sound technique developed by Phil Spector.

In 1982, the Ryans left Clannad and formed a partnership with Enya after the latter wished to pursue a solo career, with Ryan her producer and arranger and Roma her lyricist. For the next two years, Enya lived with the Ryans who then lived in Artane, a northern Dublin suburb while she practised her music skills and recorded a selection of demos. In September 1983, the three became directors of their music company Aigle Music, with "aigle" being the French word for "eagle". Using a mixing board originally made for Clannad, the three constructed a home recording facility and named it Aigle Studio.

Discography
1978 — Clannad in Concert - Clannad
1978 — Live in Dublin — Christy Moore
1985 — The Frog Prince: The Original Soundtrack Recording — Enya and other artists
1987 — Stony Steps — Matt Molloy
1987 — Cosa Gan Bhróga - Eithne Ní Uallacháin, Gerry O'Connor & Desi Wilkinson
1987 — Enya — Enya
1988 — Watermark — Enya
1989 — Lead the Knave — Nollaig Casey
1991 — Shepherd Moons — Enya
1995 — Take the Air — Sean Ryan
1995 — The Memory of Trees — Enya
1997 — Paint the Sky with Stars — Enya
1999 — Across the Bridge of Hope	
2000 — A Day Without Rain — Enya
2000 — Srenga Oir — John Feeley
2001 — The Lord of the Rings: The Fellowship of the Ring [Original Motion Picture Soundtrack]
2005 — Amarantine — Enya
2006 — Sounds of the Season: The Enya Holiday Collection — Enya
2008 — And Winter Came... — Enya
2009 — The Very Best of Enya — Enya
2015 — Dark Sky Island'' — Enya

References

External links
Official Website

2015 interview on SoundCloud: https://soundcloud.com/user-210394598/nicky-ryan-unity-interview

Grammy Award winners
People from Artane, Dublin
Living people
1946 births